Chichester is a township municipality and village in the Canadian province of Quebec, located within the Pontiac Regional County Municipality.

Chichester is located along the north shores of the Ottawa River across from Chapeau on Allumette Island.

Its settlements include Chichester and Nichabau. Nichabau, also known as Nicabeau or Nichabong, is a scenic hamlet located northwest of Chichester in what used to be referred to as Poupore's Limits. It is noted for its great number of square log homes.

Geography
The northern part of the municipal territory is sparsely populated and undeveloped, dotted with several lakes including Lake McGillivray. The southern portion is mostly cleared and used for agriculture, and where the 2 communities are located.

History

The Gale and Duberger Map of 1795 already showed the planned "Chicheter" [sic] Township but it was not officially proclaimed until 1849. It is named after the administrative capital of West Sussex, England.

In 1854, the local post office opened (closed in 1970). In 1855, the township was incorporated as a  municipality with John B. Poupore as its first mayor.

Chichester was once a thriving community with numerous sawmills, a grist mill, shingle mill, blacksmith shop and two hotels. In the 19th century (1873-1876), the township tried to boost its economy by petitioning the Federal Department of Public Works to build large wooden locks in the Culbute Channel of the Ottawa River, claimed to be the largest wooden ones in Canada. The locks were meant to allow steamboat travel on the upper portion of the river but this idea never caught on. The Culbute Locks (and associated dam) were in use from 1876 until the fall of 1889 when they were "...abandoned to the forces of the river and Nature's wood-rotting agents..."

Today, the municipality is predominantly dependent on farming, lumbering, and some summer tourism.

Demographics 

Mother tongue (2016):
 English as first language: 86.1%
 French as first language: 10.8%
 Other as first language: 3.1%

See also
 List of township municipalities in Quebec

References

External links

Township municipalities in Quebec
Incorporated places in Outaouais